Desirée Venn Frederic (born 1982, Sierra Leone) is a social alchemist, business owner, and artist based in Washington D.C.

References

External links 
desirée venn frederic

Living people
1982 births
Sierra Leonean emigrants to the United States
Sierra Leonean refugees